Oldham County High School (OCHS) is a public high school in Buckner, Kentucky, United States. It was founded in 1953 and has a student body of approximately 1,600 students in 9th through 12th grades. OCHS was given the National Blue Ribbon School of Excellence award in 1985 and 2002.

History
In the early 20th century, high school in Oldham County was held in a two-room house in Centerfield. A high school building was built near the former Crestwood Elementary on KY 22 in the 1920s; the current building in Buckner opened in 1953. The school gained accreditation by the Southern Association of Colleges and Schools in 1960.

It remained the only public high school in the county until 1989, when the school district was split into two high school attendance zones to handle the population growth resulting from Oldham County's decades-long transition from a rural area to a bedroom community for Louisville. That fall, the new South Oldham High School was opened in Crestwood. In order to further alleviate overcrowding, North Oldham High School was opened in 2003. In 2006/2007 construction began to allow for more students and is now finished.

OTVX and the Clarion Colonel

The Broadcast Journalism program was founded in the 2005-2006 academic term. The program has placed second in the state for the Four A (AAAA) division from the Kentucky High School Journalism Association. Additionally, it earned an honorable mention in the 2007 48 hour film project.

Oldham County's school newspaper, the Clarion Colonel, has won numerous gold medals from the Columbia Scholastic Press Association, affiliated with Columbia University's Graduate School of Journalism in New York City, and has placed first in the state of Kentucky in the Four A (AAAA) division in 2005, 2006, 2007, 2008, 2009, and 2010 from the Kentucky High School Journalism Association.

Oldham County High School Band program

The Oldham County High School Band program, under the direction of Brad Rogers until 2021, has received numerous awards and recognitions for concert and marching performance, including consistent distinguished ratings in Kentucky Music Educators Association (KMEA) Regional and State Large Ensemble Assessment events, and until 2003 when the marching band moved to a non-competitive format, earned consistent distinguished ratings in the KMEA State Marching Band championships (including five state finalist performances in class 2A and 4A).

The Symphonic Bands have performed with distinction in festival performances held in Toronto (three times), St. Louis, San Antonio, Boston, New York City, Chicago (Orchestra Hall), Chattanooga (TN), and Williamsburg (VA). They have also performed as a featured ensemble at the KMEA In-Service Conference four times (2006, 2010, 2014 and 2018), and served as a clinic ensemble at the Conference on three other occasions.  Tuba-Euphonium and Flute ensembles from OCHS also performed there in 2013 and 2014.

Many student performers audition successfully into the All 5th District bands, and a significant number of them subsequently earn positions in the Kentucky All State Bands every year.  All band students perform in at least one event at the KMEA Solo and Ensemble Assessment each spring.

Instrumental music course offerings at Oldham County High School include two ability-leveled, auditioned concert bands, jazz ensemble, and percussion ensemble.  All meet daily as credit elective courses.  The Marching Colonels are made up of students from both concert ensembles and the percussion ensemble class. This non-competitive ensemble performs at home football games and local events, splitting into two large pep bands to support boys and girls basketball during the winter months.

Sports

The Lady Colonels volleyball team defeated arch-rivals South Oldham to win their first district championship on October 10, 2007. The team was led by captains Tara Huckvale and Jordyn Ford, and was coached by Aaron Moore.

The Oldham County boys' basketball team made its 16th trip to the State Basketball Tournament (The "Sweet 16") in March 2012.

The Lady Colonels basketball team won the 1986 Girls' State Championships coached by former principal, Dr. Dave Weedman.  They finished as runners-up to Louisville Southern in 1988, and reached the state semi-finals in 1980.

The boys' soccer team made it to the elite eight and then went on to win state for the twenty-second time most in Kentucky state history.

Oldham County HS girls cross country has won their state class title 7 years in a row (2014,2015,2016,2017,2018,2019,2020).

Academic Decathlon
OCHS represented the state of Kentucky in the national finals of the United States Academic Decathlon in 1993, 1997–2006, and 2009.

Notable alumni
David Blake, better known as StankDawg, hacker and creator of the Binary Revolution Radio show
Tom Blankenship, bassist of indie rock band My Morning Jacket
Kyra Elzy, head coach of the Kentucky Wildcats women's basketball team
Bryan Garris, lead vocalist of hardcore punk band Knocked Loose
 Isaac Hale, guitarist of hardcore punk band Knocked Loose
 Kevin Kaine, drummer of hardcore punk band Knocked Loose
Dean Kiekhefer, professional pitcher for the St. Louis Cardinals
Dallas Robinson, the state of Kentucky's sole Army Veteran and Olympian from the 2014 Olympics; Sochi Russia.
Donta Smith, professional basketball player for Maccabi Haifa, 2014 Israeli Basketball Premier League MVP

References

External links
Oldham County High School website
Oldham County High School PTSA
Oldham County High School Sports

Educational institutions established in 1953
Public high schools in Kentucky
Schools in Oldham County, Kentucky
1953 establishments in Kentucky